Novarro is a surname. Notable people with the surname include:

David Novarro, television news journalist for WABC-TV in New York
Eddy Novarro (1925–2003),  photographer, a collector and a cosmopolitan
Nate Novarro (born 1986), drummer for Cobra Starship
Ramon Novarro (1899–1968), Mexican film, stage and television actor
 Greg Novarro, (born 1970) All-American Football Player at Bentley University and Amazon Published Author. Cousin of Nate Novarro drummer for Cobra Starship

See also
 Novaro
 Navarro